The second season of Caribbean's Next Top Model, a Caribbean reality television show, premiered on October 19, 2015. It features a number of aspiring models from the entire Caribbean region, who compete for a chance to begin their career in the modelling industry.

This cycle features a smaller cast, from 12 contestants last season to 11, two from Trinidad and Tobago and one from Antigua and Barbuda, Barbados, Cayman Islands, Grenada, Jamaica, Puerto Rico, Saint Lucia, Saint Vincent and the Grenadines and Suriname. 
Antigua and Barbuda, Grenada, Puerto Rico, Saint Lucia, Saint Vincent and the Grenadines mark their debut this season while Bahamas, Curaçao and  Guadeloupe have no representation.

The winner of the competition was 19 year-old Kittisha Doyle from Grenada. In addition  to her win, she received a cash price of $25.000, a modeling contract with Mint Management in New York City, a cover and spread in She magazine and a movie role.

Casting
Casting calls for the second season were held in July and August 2015 in Barbados, Cayman Islands, Jamaica and Trinidad and Tobago. Participants were also encouraged to sign up online to make it more accessible for potential participants throughout the region.

Contestants
(ages stated are at start of contest)

Episodes

Episode 1: Caribbean Pool
Original Airdate: 

The contestants for season two of Caribbean's Next Top Model are introduced. Later, the models prepare to meet the judges for the first time.

Episode 2: Point & Click
Original Airdate: 

The pool of fifteen semi-finalists is reduced by five, and Wendy Fitzwilliam chooses the final ten contestants who will move into the top model house to fight for the title of Caribbean's Next Top Model.

Eliminated: Aaliyah Hydes, Anasha Dutchin, Marisa Jackson, Safora Jap A Joe & Shenelle Flanders
Wildcard contestant: Krissle Garcia

Episode 3: Make-up or Break-up
Original Airdate: 

The models were taught to enhance and complement their beauty by international beauty and fashion model Lene Hall. The make-up challenge was won by Lia. Next up, they went to Lanterns Mall for the model makeovers and the tension, tempers and tears begin to flare as the girls break up with their former selves so that their inner model emerges and then they have a group shot with their makeover. At judging panel, Carol-Ann & Raquel was eliminated in surprise double elimination.

Challenge winner: Mackella Moo-Young
First call-out: Lia Ross
Bottom two: Carol-Ann King & Raquel Wijnerman
Eliminated: Carol-Ann King & Raquel Wijnerman
Special guest: Lene Hall

Episode 4: Channelling King Midas
Original Airdate: 

The models are put through their paces to understand their body lines and the art of posing by judge Richard Young. The models are then taken to the studio and body painted in gold to bring their fierce and strike statuesque poses to determine who will remain in the running to become Caribbean’s Next Top Model. At judging panel, Krissle was eliminated.

First call-out: Kittisha Doyle
Bottom two: Krissle Garcia & Sydney Solomon
Eliminated: Krissle Garcia

Episode 5: Surf's Up
Original Airdate: 

The models are taught the fundamentals of surfing and the need to mirror that balance and core strength when striking a pose. They then compete in a paddle board challenge which creates a splash for those who cannot swim. The models went to Mullins Beach and participate in a classic swimsuit photoshoot to determine if those lessons in core strength resonated. The best of the bunch remain in the running, but Mackella wais the next one to go home.

First call-out: Yugge Farrell
Bottom two: Mackella Moo-Young & Sydney Solomon
Eliminated: Mackella Moo-Young

Episode 6: Sssssss
Original Airdate: 

The models are thrown into the real world with their go-sees as they meet designers who determine if they would book them or not for their own lines of clothing. On the photoshoot, they went to Flower Forest. Hollywood Stylist and designer Charlie Lapson shows the girls how to bring their best fierce while wrapped in his elegant jewels along with pythons. At judging panel, Lia was eliminated.

First call-out: Nicoya Henry	
Bottom two: Ayana Jeune Whitehead & Lia Ross	
Eliminated: Lia Ross
Special guest: Charlie Lapson

Episode 7: Come on move this
Original Airdate: 

The models are given pointers from head judge Wendy Fitzwilliam. She highlights each girls strength thus far, but more importantly her weakness and how each of them can move and align their bodies to accentuate their best assets and move up to the top of the judges’ leader board. Along the beautiful Bajan West Coast, the girls have a retro Pin-up photo shoot at Drift Bar on The Beach House. Movement specialist and lead actor, Dani Swan, in the upcoming movie Cerulean does the Creative Direction. At judging panel, Yugge was eliminated.

First call-out: Kittisha Doyle	
Bottom two: Sydney Solomon & Yugge Farrell		
Eliminated: Yugge Farrell
Special guest: Dani Swan

Episode 8: Doh Jumbie Meh
Original Airdate: 

The models overcome any fears of heights as they are taught to stilt walk as Moko Jumbies, elevating their poise and challenging their core strength. Lead photographer and judge Pedro Virgil takes the girls to Carlisle Bay beach for a Carnival themed photo shoot where the ladies must bring their festive best. At judging panel, Sydney was eliminated.

First call-out: Kittisha Doyle	
Bottom two: Ayana Jeune Whitehead & Sydney Solomon	
Eliminated: Sydney Solomon

Episode 9: Inter-Act-ion
Original Airdate: 

Movement specialist and lead actor in the upcoming movie Cerulean, Dani Swan, gives the girls some acting tips under the watchful eye of FLOW brand executive, Bernard Stewart, as the models are challenged to convince Bernard that they are worthy of being FLOW Ambassadors. The models need to focus on their poise and balance as they pose aboard a catamaran out in the clear, beautiful Shallow Draft ocean. At judging panel, Ayana & Nicoya was eliminated.

First call-out: Kittisha Doyle	
Bottom three: Ayana Jeune Whitehead, Linda Mejia Torres & Nicoya Henry	
Eliminated: Ayana Jeune Whitehead & Nicoya Henry
Special guest: Bernard Stewart, Dani Swan & Jo Lance

Episode 10: Tis the Season
Original Airdate: 

A recap of the entire season is aired, showing all the highlights, melt downs, triumphs and behind the scenes footage. The villains, the victors and the girls next door are featured in all their splendour as the viewers get greater insight into the journeys that each model took to get to that point and only the very best are left to emerge as Caribbean’s Next Top Model

Episode 11: All I do is Win Win Win
Original Airdate: 

The final two models have a high fashion photo shoot on The Pier at the Radisson Aquatica to prove their ability to do editorial for noted Caribbean magazine editor, Mae Wayne in the elegantly detailed and beaded couture collection of Puerto Rican designer, Sonia Santiago. The finalists are then challenged to strut the runway in the high fashion collections of Barbados’ most recognized and versatile designers going from avant garde to island chic in minutes. The winner emerges and the Caribbean’s Next Top Model is Kittisha.

Final two: Kittisha Doyle & Linda Mejia Torres
Caribbean's Next Top Model: Kittisha Doyle
Guest judge: Mae Wayne

Summaries

Call-out order

 The contestant was eliminated
 The contestant won the competition.

Photo shoot guide
Episode 2 photo shoot: Extreme posing; natural beauty shots (casting)
Episode 3 photo shoot: Makeovers
Episode 4 photo shoot: Nude and covered with gold body paint
Episode 5 photo shoot: Bikinis on Mullins beach
Episode 6 photo shoot: Diamond Jewelry shoot with snakes 
Episode 7 photo shoot: Pin-up girls in pairs
Episode 8 photo shoot: Carnival on the beach
Episode 9 photo shoot: Dynamic posing on a catamaran
Episode 11 photo shoot: White and silver evening gowns

Judges

 Wendy Fitzwilliam (Host/Head judge) Supermodel
 Pedro Virgil (Judge) Fashion photographer
 Richard Young (Judge) Creative director

References

2
Television in the Caribbean
2015 television seasons